Aleksandar Ganchev (Bulgarian: Александър Ганчев; born 9 July 2001) is a Bulgarian footballer who plays as a full back for Ludogorets Razgrad.

Career
Kelyovluev started his career in his local Ludogorets Razgrad academy. completed his league debut for the club on 26 May 2021 in a match against CSKA 1948.

References

External links
 

2000 births
Living people
Bulgarian footballers
Bulgaria youth international footballers
PFC Ludogorets Razgrad II players
PFC Ludogorets Razgrad players
First Professional Football League (Bulgaria) players
Association football midfielders